Cliff Shirley (22 March 1917 – 25 December 2001) was a New Zealand cricketer. He played one first-class match for Otago in 1945/46.

See also
 List of Otago representative cricketers

References

External links
 

1917 births
2001 deaths
Burials at Eastern Cemetery, Invercargill
New Zealand cricketers
Otago cricketers
Cricketers from Invercargill